Ben Boeke Ice Rink (often shortened to "Boeke" or "BB1/BB2") is an ice hockey arena  in Anchorage, Alaska that opened in 1974. It is named after former Anchorage city clerk Benjamin W. Boeke, who served from 1947 to 1967, under 11 mayors and 8 city managers. The arena is owned by the Municipality of Anchorage and operated by ASM Global, a nationwide property management company.

About
The Ben Boeke sits in the southwest region of Fairview, a neighborhood in Anchorage. The arena contains two ice surfaces, each 200' x 85'. Rink 1 has a seating capacity of 688 and 275 standing room whereas Rink 2 is much smaller and only seats a maximum of 100 people and standing room 275. Rink 1 and Rink 2 bleachers are accommodated with hanging inferred heating.

Ben Boeke Ice Rink is located adjacent to the Sullivan Arena. The arena is occasionally used as an overflow venue for the Sullivan's larger events, such as the Great Alaska Sportsman Show. It shares parking with Mulcahy Stadium and Anchorage Football Stadium, Bonnie Cusack outdoor Ice Rinks.

References

External links
 

Indoor ice hockey venues in Alaska
Sports venues in Anchorage, Alaska
1974 establishments in Alaska
Sports venues completed in 1974